

Group A

Scotland

Head coach:  Craig Brown

Ghana
Head coach:  Paulo Luís Campos

Cuba
Head coaches:  Manuel Rodríguez

Bahrain
Head coach:  Aziz Amin

Group B

East Germany

Head coach:  Eberhard Vogel

Australia
Head coach:  Vic Dalgleish

United States

Head coach:  Roy Rees

Brazil
Head coach:  Homero Cavalheiro

Group C

Argentina
Head coach:  Carlos Pachamé

China

Head coach:  Zhu Guanghu

 Only 17 players in China squad. (13) Xu Yang MF 06/06/1974 Bayi Football Team

Nigeria
Head coach:  Sebastian Broderick-Imasuen

Canada
Head coach:  Bert Goldberger

Group D

Guinea
Head coach:  Nansoko Sadio

Colombia

Head coach:  Dulio Miranda Mari

Saudi Arabia

Head coach:  Ivo Wortmann

Portugal

Head coach:  Carlos Queiroz

Fifa U-17 World Championship Squads, 1989
FIFA U-17 World Cup squads